Farmanullah (born 14 March 2001) is an Afghan cricketer. He made his first-class debut for Band-e-Amir Region in the 2017–18 Ahmad Shah Abdali 4-day Tournament on 1 November 2017. He made his List A debut for Band-e-Amir Region in the 2018 Ghazi Amanullah Khan Regional One Day Tournament on 23 July 2018. He made his Twenty20 debut on 8 October 2019, for Amo Sharks in the 2019 Shpageeza Cricket League.

References

External links
 

2001 births
Living people
Afghan cricketers
Band-e-Amir Dragons cricketers
Place of birth missing (living people)